Sometimes, Forever is the third studio album by American indie rock singer-songwriter Soccer Mommy. Released under Loma Vista Recordings on June 24, 2022, it is her first album produced by Daniel Lopatin.

Background
Sophie Allison began working with Daniel Lopatin—better known as Oneohtrix Point Never—on her third album in late 2020,  a few months after the release of her second album Color Theory. While continuing Allison's tradition of confessional lyricism, Sometimes, Forever, sees the singer-songwriter explore new sonic landscapes, including shoegaze and industrial noise.

Release and promotion
Allison announced Sometimes, Forever on March 23, 2022, releasing the album's lead single "Shotgun" simultaneously. Allison proceeded to release three more singles — "Unholy Affliction", "Bones" and "Newdemo" in the lead-up to the album's release. In the run-up to the Sometimes, Forever's release, Allison sat down for interviews with outlets including Pitchfork and Rolling Stone. She also performed live on Jimmy Fallon's Tonight Show.

Critical reception

Sometimes, Forever has a score of 84/100 on Metacritic based on 20 reviews, indicating "universal acclaim"; the highest score for any Soccer Mommy album to date.

Albumism critic Jeremy Levine gave the album a perfect score, saying that "it cements Soccer Mommy as one of the most exciting voices in indie pop."
Pastes Eric Bennett described it as Soccer Mommy's "most creative work to date", while The Line of Best Fit critic Tom Williams described Sometimes, Forever as "an astounding artistic accomplishment that deserves to propel Allison to the very highest ranks of the indie world." A minority of critics, however, offered more mixed reviews, with Slant Magazines Thomas Bedenbaugh describing the album as "an ambitious but unmemorable experiment", lacking the "indelible" "lyrical themes and melodies" of her previous work. Writing for PopMatters, John Amen gave the album 7/10 and remarked, "Absent an infectious melody and accompaniment that establishes rhythmic and/or ambient contrast, her voice tends to grow monotonous and disengaging. But when the aesthetic balances are in place, as they are for much of Sometimes, Forever, then Allison glows like a moon reflecting a dying sun, one of the substantial artists of her generation."

Track listing
All tracks were written by Sophie Allison and produced by Daniel Lopatin.

Charts

References

External links

2022 albums
Soccer Mommy albums
Loma Vista Recordings albums
Albums produced by Daniel Lopatin